Paul Pineau (7 December 1923 – 13 March 2006) was a French racing cyclist. He rode in the 1949 Tour de France.

References

External links
 

1923 births
2006 deaths
French male cyclists
Sportspeople from Maine-et-Loire
Cyclists from Pays de la Loire